Balushahi'' is a traditional dessert originating from the Indian subcontinent. It is similar to a glazed doughnut in terms of ingredients, but differs in texture and taste. In South India, a similar pastry is known as badushah'''.

Variations

Balushahi
Balushahis are made of maida flour, and are deep-fried in clarified butter and then dipped in sugar syrup.

Badushah
Badushahs (also spelled bhadushah) are made from a stiff dough made with all-purpose flour, ghee and a pinch of baking soda. One-inch-diameter ,  discs are shaped by hand, fried in ghee or oil and dunked in thick sugar syrup to make a sugar coating. They are very sweet, but tasty with a slightly flaky texture.

Badushahs are sold in sweet shops in Andhra Pradesh, Telangana, Kerala, Karnataka and Tamil Nadu.

See also

List of fried dough foods
List of doughnut varieties
Bihari Cuisine
Pakistani cuisine
Indian cuisine
Indian sweets

References

Doughnuts
Indian desserts
Bihari cuisine
Pakistani desserts